One the Woman is a 2021 South Korean television series directed by Choi Hyeong-hun and written by Kim Yoon. It stars Lee Hanee in a dual role, Lee Sang-yoon, Jin Seo-yeon, and Lee Won-geun. The drama premiered on SBS TV on September 17, 2021 and aired every Friday and Saturday, at 22:00 (KST).

The series ended on November 6, 2021 after airing 16 episodes. The last episode achieved a viewership of 17.8%, about 3.2 million views, which was its highest nationwide ratings in its entire run.

Synopsis
The life of Jo Yeon-joo (Honey Lee), a prosecutor with tough personality, changes completely after waking up from a coma and discovering that she suffers from amnesia caused by a car accident. She is mistaken for Kang Mi-na, a cold woman who looks just like her. Mi-na is the youngest daughter of Yumin Group and the second daughter-in-law of the Han family, owners of Hanju Group. Due to Kang Mi-na's illegitimate status, both of her family and her husband family mistreat her. However, when Yeon-joo lives as Mi-na in Han's household, she fights back against the family's mistreatment of her.

Han Seung-wook (Lee Sang-yoon) is a chaebol, who still cherishes his first love. He left South Korea because he wanted to avoid the savagery of a fight for inheritance, but comes back in order to discover the truth behind his father’s sordid death. When he meets his first love by chance, he does not want to lose her again.

Cast

Main
 Lee Hanee as Jo Yeon-joo / Kang Mi-na
Kim Do-yeon as young Jo Yeon-joo / Kang Mi-na
Lee Hwa-kyum as Kang Mi-na after plastic surgery / Kim Eun-jung 
 Jo Yeon-joo: 33 years old, a graduate from Seoul National University School of Law, she works at the Seoul Central District Prosecutors' Office. She worked hard on her own to lift her career from the bottom. Because she had to interact with gangsters from various countries, she endeavored to learn how to speak at least 4 languages. She is skilled in martial arts which she uses to subdue gangsters. Because of the harsh environment she grew up in, she developed a strong stamina and strength enabling her to withstand physical assaults that can be life-threatening to others.
 Kang Mi-na: 34 years old, youngest and illegitimate daughter of Yumin Group and the second daughter-in-law of Hanju Group. Because of her illegitimate background, her family and her husband's family treat her like a maid. In order to hide and help Yeon-joo while trying to expose Han Sung-hye, she undergoes plastic surgery and poses as Han Sung-hye's newly hired secretary, Kim Eun-jung

 Lee Sang-yoon as Han Seung-wook / Alex Chang
 Kim Young-hoon as young Han Seung-wook
 36 years old, a third-generation disgraced chaebol, he is the only son of Chairman Han's late brother and Kang Mi-na's former boyfriend. After being exiled by his uncle, he returns to South Korea to seek the truth behind his father's death and also to find his first love.
 Jin Seo-yeon as Han Seong-hye
 38 years old, a talented businesswoman, she is the eldest daughter of Hanju Group and Kang Mi-na's sister-in-law. An ambitious and narcissistic heiress, she would do anything to get what she wants including getting rid of people whom she believes are standing on her way. When she was younger, she accidentally killed her uncle and hit Yeon-joo's grandmother when she ran away from the factory.
 Lee Won-keun as Ahn Yoo-jun
 32 years old, Jo Yeon-joo's university friend, who comes from a wealthy background and works as a prosecutor at the Seopyeong District Prosecutors' Office. He has feelings for her.

Supporting

Hanju Group Family 
 Song Won-seok as Han Seong-woon
 34 years old, second son of Hanju Group, married to Kang Mi-na. However, due to his unhappy marriage with Kang Mi-na, he had an affair with a famous announcer, Park So-yi. However, after he meets Jo Yeon-joo he falls in love with her.
 Jeon Kuk-hwan as Han Young-sik
68 years old, the Chairman of Hanju Group, a leading conglomerate in South Korea. He is Kang Mi-na's father-in-law. He bribed and supported Ryu Seung-deok which allows him to freely commit financial crimes.
 Na Young-hee as Seo Young-won
64 years old, Kang Mi-na's mother-in-law. She often abuses Kang Mi-na. However, when Yeon-joo lives with her, she became the main target of Yeon-joo's insults. One day, Kang Mi-na tells her the truth about her elder son's death.
 Song Seung-ha as Han Sung-mi
30 years old, Hanju Group's youngest daughter who disrespects Kang Mi-na. She is a vain heiress who only loves shopping and going to salons.
 Jo Yeon-hee as Heo Jae-hee
36 years old, first daughter-in-law of Hanju Group. She is a widow who always feels insecure about her son's future considering the absence of her husband, Han Seong-chan, who was one of the main heir of Hanju Group that was murdered by Han Seong-hye.
 Shin Seo-woo as Han Seon-woo
9 years old, Han Seong-chan and Heo Jae-hee's son, as well as the only grandchild of Hanju Group. He is pampered by his mother who wants him to be accepted as Hanju Group's heir even with the absence of his father.

People around Han Family 
 Kim Chang-wan as Noh Hak-tae
A former prosecutor and the current head of Hanju Group's legal team, he was a close friend of Han Seung-wook's father.
 Ye Soo-jung as Kim Kyung-shin
 Nicknamed "Director Kim", she is Hanju Group's housekeeper and a woman of great mystery. Later it is revealed that Seung-wook's grandfather entrusted some of his shares to her, which she uses it to expel Han Young-sik and his family's influence in the group.
 Kim Bong-man as Jeong Do-woo
 Loyal bodyguard and assistant of Han Seong-hye who helped her get rid of the evidence that she killed her uncle (Han Seung-wook's father) by burning down the Hanju fashion's factory. He bribed Jo Yeon-joo's father so that he would confess that he is the arsonist. He supports Han Seong-hye and all of her crimes because he was manipulated by her through his sickly sister.
 Jiyun Kim Huong as Trang
 A Vietnamese maid who is able to speak Korean fluently but hid that fact in order to preserve her job at Hanju's household. Yeon-joo as Kang Mi-na always extracts information about Kang Mi-na and the Hanju group from her.

People around Jo Yeon-joo
 Kim Won-hae as Ryu Seung-deok
 Jo Yeon-joo's senior and one of the Deputy Chiefs of the Seoul Central District Prosecutors' Office. Later in an episode, he is promoted to  the Chief of the Seoul Central District Prosecutors' Office mainly due Hanju Group's influence. Jo Yeon-joo holds a grudge against him for hiding the fact that Hanju's heiress Han Seong-hye was involved in her grandmother's death.
 Jung In-gi as Kang Myung-guk
Jo Yeon-joo's father. He was a gangster who tried to change his ways because of her daughter. He was bribed by Hanju group to confess as the preparator of an arson in Hanju Fashion's factory that killed Han Seung-wook's father. Without Yeon-joo knowing, the money was used to pay for her law school tuition fee.
 Lee Gyu-bok as Wang Pil-gyu 
 A former gangster who worked under Myung Guk. He owns a sushi restaurant. At Yeon-joo's request, he helps victims retaliate against perpetrators who are not properly punished for their crimes. He was asked by Myung-guk to take care of Yeon-joo.
 Jo Dal-hwan as Choi Dae-chi
A former gangster and Wang Pil-gyu's right hand man.

Others 
 Park Jeong-hwa as Park So-yi 
Han Seong-woon's mistress. She is an announcer for the Nine O'Clock News who got the job solely because of Seong-woon. Kang Mi-na knows about the affair but she keeps silent about it. However Yeon-joo (as Kang Mi-na) harshly humiliated her and Seong-woon.
 Kim Jae-young as Lee Bong-sik 
 A con artist that was chased by Jo Yeon-joo in order to impress her seniors. He helped Kang Mi-na leave South Korea and go abroad to escape from her abusive families. He holds a list of conglomerate chairmen who buy his fake art pieces so those chairmen are able to bribe law enforcers using those art pieces or using them for money laundering. Due to his involvement with Han Young-sik, he is protected by Ryu Seung-deok. 
 Hwang Young-hee as  Kang Eun-hwa 
Kang Mi-na's paternal aunt and the President of Yumin Foundation. She wants Mi-na (who is replaced by Yeon-joo) to be fired from being Yumin's president and heiress, even to the point supporting Hanju Group's attempt to acquire Yumin's hotel so that she can get the whole ownership of Yumin group for her own.

Special appearances
 Kim Nam-gil as male priest who leads to heaven. Lee Ha-nee previously worked with him in another action comedy drama The Fiery Priest
 Jin Seon-kyu as chicken delivery man. Lee Ha-nee previously worked with him in an action comedy film Extreme Job.
 Sung Byung-sook as Yeon-joo's grandmother
 Chun-sik

Production
On December 30, 2020 Lee Sang-yoon and Kim Ah-joong were considered for the main leads of the series. Lee Sang-yoon confirmed his appearance, but Kim Ah-joong refused the offer.

On June 18, 2021 the line-up was announced. This is Honey Lee's first drama after SBS' 2019 hit, The Fiery Priest. Incidentally, she portrayed another corrupt prosecutor in that series for her character Jo Yeon-joo. EXID's Park Jeong-hwa also joined the cast.

On August 4, photos from the script reading were released.

Original soundtrack

One the Woman OST (Various Artist)

Singles 

Part 1

Part 2

Part 3

Part 4

Part 5

Viewership 
 Audience response

Awards and nominations

References

External links
  
 One the Woman at Daum 
  One the Woman at Naver 
 
 

Seoul Broadcasting System television dramas
2021 South Korean television series debuts
2021 South Korean television series endings
Korean-language television shows
South Korean comedy-drama television series
Television series by Studio S
Fiction about body swapping
Wavve original programming